Ester Krumbachová (12 November 1923 – 13 January 1996) was a Czech screenwriter, costume designer, stage designer, author and director. She is known for her contributions to Czech New Wave cinema in the 1960s, including collaborations with directors Věra Chytilová and Jan Němec. In 2017, a private archive of Krumbachová's artwork, photography, documents, and clothes was made public by curators Edith Jeřábková and Zuzana Blochová. Krumbachová has since been the subject of retrospective exhibitions at TRANZITDISPLAY in Prague (2017), and the Centre for Contemporary Arts in Glasgow (2018).

Early life
Ester Krumbachová was born in Brno, Czechoslovakia in 1923. She went to college and worked on local theater productions in České Budějovice before moving to Prague in the early 1960s. She began to work in the film industry in 1961.

Career
She worked as a costume designer on the film Diamonds of the Night (1964), directed by her husband Jan Němec; this was her first collaboration with Němec.
Her first addition to a script was on Zbyněk Brynych's Holocaust film The Fifth Horseman is Fear (1965). However, this credit is masked by her only being listed the film's costume designer.
Her major script contribution was on the screenplay for Němec's A Report on the Party and the Guests (1966). The film is based on a novella by Krumbachová.
Eventually, she would be banned from film making because of her involvement with A Report on the Party and the Guests.

In 1966, she worked on Daisies as a costume designer and writer; this was her first screenplay with Věra Chytilová, a long time collaborator. She would work on two more films with Chytilová, Fruit of Paradise (1970) and Faunovo velmi pozdní odpoledne (1983).

Krumbachová's next collaboration with Němec was on the film Martyrs of Love (1967) which was described as being "less political in nature" than A Report on the Party and the Guests and more "arbitrary and obscure in its details." In 1968, after the Prague Spring she worked on Fruit of Paradise, an avant garde adaptation of the Adam and Eve story, with Chytilová. in 1969, Krumbachová began to write The Murder of Mr.Devil with Němec; this would be the only film she would direct.
Veteran Czech filmmaker Otakar Vávra consulted Krumbachová on his 1970 film Witchhammer. She adapted Valerie and Her Week of Wonders  from the novel of the same name with Czech director Jaromil Jireš in the same year. In 1983 she worked on two films, Faunovo velmi pozdní odpoledne which was her last colabortation with Chytilová, and Strata, a New Zealand film. Krumbachová published a book První knížka Ester (The First Book of Ester) in 1994.

Legacy
Much of Krumbachová's work has been overlooked, despite her influence on the Czech New Wave.

In Jan Němec's film Late Talks with My Mother (2001), she appears as one of the people Němec talks to.

In 2005, Věra Chytilová directed the documentary In Search of Ester about Krumbachová's life and involvement in the Czech New Wave.

Krumbachová was the subject of the retrospective exhibition A Weakness for Raisins: Films and Archives of Ester Krumbachovà at the CCA: Centre for Contemporary Arts in Glasgow. The exhibition presented elements of Krumbachovà's personal archives to explore themes of "agency, magic, materialism, gender, feminism, the interconnected nature of reality, and sensory forms of knowledge." The exhibition also featured contemporary artists whose work has been influenced by Krumbachová, including ACID PRAWN (Sian Dorrer), Marek Meduna, Sally Hackett and France-Lise McGurn.

Personal life and death
She was briefly married to architect Slavíček Písařík ) before marrying Czech director Jan Němec in 1963; they divorced in 1968. Němec described her as his "muse".

Krumbachová died in 1996 in Prague.

Filmography
As writer
The Fifth Horseman is Fear (1965)
Daisies (1966)
A Report on the Party and the Guests (1966)
Martyrs of Love (1967)
Mother and Son (1967)
Witchhammer (1970)
Fruit of Paradise (1970)
Killing the Devil (1970)
Valerie and Her Week of Wonders (1970)
Faunovo velmi pozdní odpoledne (1983)
Strata (1983)

As costume designer
Poslední motýl (1991) 
Tajemství velikeho vypravěče (1972)
Straw Hat (1972)
Byli jednou dva písaři (1972)
Nevěsta (1970)
Fruit of Paradise (1970)
Ezop (1970)
Muž, ktery stoupl v ceně (1969)
All My Compatriots (1969)
Pensión pro svobodné pány (1968)
The Nun's Night (1967)
Ta naše písnička česká (1967)
Martyrs of Love (1967)
Romance for Bugle (1967)
A Report on the Party and the Guests (1966)
Daisies (1966)
Long Live the Republic (1965)
The Fifth Horseman is Fear (1965)
If a Thousand Clarinets (1965)
The Dear Departed (1964)
Diamonds of the Night (1964)

As director
 The Murder of Mr.Devil (1971)

Bibliography
První knížka Ester (The First Book of Ester) (1994)

References

Further reading

External links

 

1923 births
1996 deaths
Film people from Brno
Czech film directors
Czech screenwriters
Czech women film directors
Czech women screenwriters
20th-century screenwriters